Maheshwar Singh is an Indian politician and member of the Bhartiya Janta Party. Singh was a member of the Himachal Pradesh Legislative Assembly from the Kullu constituency in Kullu district. He is also the owner of Lord Raghunath Temple at Kullu as a scion of erstwhile Kullu princely state. He was former member of parliament of Loksabha 3 times and Rajyasabha 1 time.

References 

People from Sirmaur district
Bharatiya Janata Party politicians from Himachal Pradesh
Janata Party politicians
Lok Janshakti Party politicians
Living people
Himachal Lokhit Party politicians
India MPs 1989–1991
India MPs 1998–1999
India MPs 1999–2004
People from Mandi district
Lok Sabha members from Himachal Pradesh
Himachal Pradesh MLAs 2012–2017
Year of birth missing (living people)